The Tibet Library, or Xizang Library, also known as the Tibet Autonomous Region Library, is an autonomous region-level public library of the Tibet Autonomous Region of the People's Republic of China, located at No. 25, Norbulingka Road, Lhasa.

Tibet Library broke ground on May 6, 1991,  and was opened to the public in June 1996. The library was set up at a cost of about 100 million yuan. It has 590,000 books and a floor space of 11,000 square meters.

References

Buildings and structures in Tibet
Libraries established in 1996